Vasylko Rostyslavych, Vasilko Rostislavich  (born around 1066, died in 1124) was a Rus' prince and member of the Rurik dynasty. He was the first Prince of Terebovl' from 1092. His Byzantine-style blinding was very unusual among the Rurik dynasty.

Life

He was the third son of Rostislav Vladimirovich, Prince of Tmutarakan. The historian Martin Dimnik writes that Vasylko's mother was Lanka, a daughter of King Béla I of Hungary.

In November 1097 Volhynian Prince  and Prince Svyatopolk II Izyaslavich of Kiev captured and blinded Vasilko Rostislavich, whom Svyatopolk had tricked into coming to Kiev. Thus, the agreements reached at an earlier meeting of the princes at the Council of Liubech were broken and war ensued.

See also 
Council of Liubech
Council of Uvetichi

References

Sources

 Rostyslavych Vasylko / Ukrainians in the world

External links
 Vasylko Rostyslavych in Encyclopedia of Ukraine, vol. 5 (1993).

11th-century princes in Kievan Rus'
12th-century princes in Kievan Rus'
Rurikids
Princes of Terebovl'
Rostislavichi family